Peoples Bus Service, formally known as the Sindh Intra-District Peoples Bus Service Project, is a public bus service by the Government of Sindh operating in Karachi.  It was inaugurated on 27 June 2022.
240 buses will run on seven different routes in Karachi. In the first phase, the bus will run from the confluence of Model Colony and Tank Chowk at Malir Cantt to Shahrah-e-Faisal, Metropole and II Chundrigar Road Tower.
 The buses will operate from 8 A.M to 8 P.M. Fares for the transportation is between PKR 25-50.

Routes 
As of February 2023, eight routes have been outlined for the bus service.

*R-1 (Pink) is the eight route outlined for the PBS in Karachi and is the first and only women-only bus service in Pakistan.

See Also 
Karachi Circular Railway

Karachi Breeze

References

Bus rapid transit in Pakistan
Transport in Karachi
2022 establishments in Pakistan
Bus rapid transit